Several riots have occurred after curfews were imposed, including:

1988 Tompkins Square Park riot
2021 Dutch curfew riots
Sunset Strip curfew riots